Rhodopsin-like receptors are a family of proteins that comprise the largest group of G protein-coupled receptors.

Scope 
G-protein-coupled receptors, GPCRs, constitute a vast protein family that encompasses a wide range of functions (including various autocrine, paracrine, and endocrine processes). They show considerable diversity at the sequence level, on the basis of which they can be separated into distinct groups. GPCRs are usually described as "superfamily" because they embrace a group of families for which there are indications of evolutionary relationship, but between which there is no statistically significant similarity in sequence. The currently known superfamily members include the rhodopsin-like GPCRs (this family), the secretin-like GPCRs, the cAMP receptors, the fungal mating pheromone receptors, and the metabotropic glutamate receptor family. There is a specialised database for GPCRs.

Function 

The rhodopsin-like GPCRs themselves represent a widespread protein family that includes hormone, neuropeptide, neurotransmitter, and light receptors, all of which transduce extracellular signals through interaction with guanine nucleotide-binding (G) proteins. Although their activating ligands vary widely in structure and character, the amino acid sequences of the receptors are very similar and are believed to adopt a common structural framework comprising 7 transmembrane (TM) helices.

Classes 
Rhodopsin-like GPCRs have been classified into the following 19 subgroups (A1-A19) based on a phylogenetic analysis.

Subfamily A1
 Chemokine receptor 
 Chemokine (C-C motif) receptor 1 (CKR1)
 Chemokine (C-C motif) receptor 2 (CKR2)
 Chemokine (C-C motif) receptor 3 (CKR3)
 Chemokine (C-C motif) receptor 4 (CKR4)
 Chemokine (C-C motif) receptor 5 (CKR5)
 Chemokine (C-C motif) receptor 8 (CKR8)
 Chemokine (C-C motif) receptor-like 2 (CKRX)
 chemokine (C motif) receptor 1 (CXC1) 
 chemokine (C-X3-C motif) receptor 1 (C3X1) 
 GPR137B (TM7SF1)

Subfamily A2
 Chemokine receptor 
 Chemokine (C-C motif) receptor-like 1 (CCR11)
 Chemokine (C-C motif) receptor 6 (CKR6)
 Chemokine (C-C motif) receptor 7 (CKR7)
 Chemokine (C-C motif) receptor 9 (CKR9)
 Chemokine (C-C motif) receptor 10 (CKRA)
 CXC chemokine receptors 
 Chemokine (C-X-C motif) receptor 3
 Chemokine (C-X-C motif) receptor 4 (Fusin)
 Chemokine (C-X-C motif) receptor 5
 Chemokine (C-X-C motif) receptor 6 (BONZO)
 Chemokine (C-X-C motif) receptor 7 (RDC1) 
 Interleukin-8  (IL8R)
 IL8R-α (CXCR1)
 IL8R-β (CXCR2)
 Adrenomedullin receptor
 Duffy blood group, chemokine receptor (DUFF)
 G Protein-coupled Receptor 30 (CML2, GPCR estrogen receptor)

Subfamily A3
 Angiotensin II receptor 
 Angiotensin II receptor, type 1 (AG2S)
 Angiotensin II receptor, type 2 (AG22)
 Apelin receptor (APJ) 
 Bradykinin receptor 
 Bradykinin receptor B1 (BRB1)
 Bradykinin receptor B2 (BRB2)
 GPR15 (GPRF)
 GPR25

Subfamily A4
 Opioid receptor 
 delta Opioid receptor (OPRD)
 kappa Opioid receptor (OPRK)
 mu Opioid receptor (OPRM)
 Nociceptin receptor (OPRX)
 Somatostatin receptor 
 Somatostatin receptor 1 (SSR1)
 Somatostatin receptor 2 (SSR2)
 Somatostatin receptor 3 (SSR3)
 Somatostatin receptor 4 (SSR4)
 Somatostatin receptor 5 (SSR5)
 GPCR neuropeptide receptor 
 Neuropeptides B/W receptor 1 (GPR7)
 Neuropeptides B/W receptor 2 (GPR8)
 GPR1 orphan receptor

Subfamily A5
 Galanin receptor 
 Galanin receptor 1 (GALR)
 Galanin receptor 2 (GALS)
 Galanin receptor 3 (GALT)
 Cysteinyl leukotriene receptor 
 Cysteinyl leukotriene receptor 1
 Cysteinyl leukotriene receptor 2
 Leukotriene B4 receptor 
 Leukotriene B4 receptor (P2Y7)
 Leukotriene B4 receptor 2
 Relaxin receptor 
 Relaxin/insulin-like family peptide receptor 1 (LGR7)
 Relaxin/insulin-like family peptide receptor 2 (GPR106)
 Relaxin/insulin-like family peptide receptor 3 (SALPR)
 Relaxin/insulin-like family peptide receptor 4 (GPR100/GPR142)
 KiSS1-derived peptide receptor (GPR54) 
 Melanin-concentrating hormone receptor 1 (GPRO) 
 Urotensin-II receptor (UR2R)

Subfamily A6
 Cholecystokinin receptor 
 Cholecystokinin A receptor (CCKR)
 Cholecystokinin B receptor (GASR)
 Neuropeptide FF receptor 
 Neuropeptide FF receptor 1 (FF1R)
 Neuropeptide FF receptor 2 (FF2R)
 Orexin receptor 
 Hypocretin (orexin) receptor 1 (OX1R)
 Hypocretin (orexin) receptor 2 (OX2R)
 Vasopressin receptor 
 Arginine vasopressin receptor 1A (V1AR)
 Arginine vasopressin receptor 1B (V1BR)
 Arginine vasopressin receptor 2 (V2R)
 Oxytocin receptor
 Gonadotropin releasing hormone receptor (GRHR) 
 Pyroglutamylated RFamide peptide receptor (GPR103)
 GPR22 (GPRM)
 GPR176 (GPR)

Subfamily A7
 Bombesin receptor 
 Bombesin-like receptor 3
 Neuromedin B receptor
 Gastrin-releasing peptide receptor
Endothelin receptor 
 Endothelin receptor type A (ET1R)
 Endothelin receptor type B (ETBR)
 GPR37 (ETBR-LP2) 
 Neuromedin U receptor 
 Neuromedin U receptor 1
 Neuromedin U receptor 2
 Neurotensin receptor 
 Neurotensin receptor 1 (NTR1)
 Neurotensin receptor 2 (NTR2)
 Thyrotropin-releasing hormone receptor (TRFR) 
 Growth hormone secretagogue receptor 
 GPR39
 Motilin receptor (GPR38)

Subfamily A8
 Anaphylatoxin receptors 
 C3a receptor (C3AR)
 C5a receptor (C5AR)
 Chemokine-like receptor 1 (CML1) 
 Formyl peptide receptor 
 Formyl peptide receptor 1 (FMLR)
 Formyl peptide receptor-like 1 (FML2)
 Formyl peptide receptor-like 2 (FML1)
 MAS1 oncogene 
 MAS1 (MAS)
 MAS1L (MRG)
 GPR1
 GPR32 (GPRW)
 GPR44
 GPR77 (C5L2)

Subfamily A9
 Melatonin receptor 
 Melatonin receptor 1A (ML1A)
 Melatonin receptor 1B (ML1B)
 Neurokinin receptor 
 Tachykinin receptor 1 (NK1R)
 Tachykinin receptor 2 (NK2R)
 Tachykinin receptor 3 (NK3R)
 Neuropeptide Y receptor 
 Neuropeptide Y receptor Y1 (NY1R)
 Neuropeptide Y receptor Y2 (NY2R)
 Pancreatic polypeptide receptor 1 (NY4R)
 Neuropeptide Y receptor Y5 (NY5R)
 Prolactin-releasing peptide receptor (PRLHR, GPRA) 
 Prokineticin receptor 1 (GPR73)
 Prokineticin receptor 2 (PKR2)
 GPR19 (GPRJ)
 GPR50 (ML1X)
 GPR75
 GPR83  (GPR72)

Subfamily A10
 Glycoprotein hormone receptor 
 FSH-receptor
 Luteinizing hormone/choriogonadotropin receptor (LSHR)
 Thyrotropin receptor
 Leucine-rich repeat-containing G protein-coupled receptor 4 (GPR48)
 Leucine-rich repeat-containing G protein-coupled receptor 5 (GPR49)
 Leucine-rich repeat-containing G protein-coupled receptor 6

Subfamily A11
 GPR40-related receptor 
 Free fatty acid receptor 1 (GPR40)
 Free fatty acid receptor 2 (GPR43)
 Free fatty acid receptor 3 (GPR41)
 GPR42 (FFAR1L)
 P2 purinoceptor 
 Purinergic receptor P2Y1
 Purinergic receptor P2Y2
 Purinergic receptor P2Y4
 Purinergic receptor P2Y6
 Purinergic receptor P2Y8
 Purinergic receptor P2Y11
 Hydroxycarboxylic acid receptor 1 (GPR81)
 Hydroxycarboxylic acid receptor 2, Niacin receptor 1 (GPR109A)
 Hydroxycarboxylic acid receptor 3, Niacin receptor 2 (GPR109B, HM74)
 GPR31 (GPRV)
 GPR82
 Oxoglutarate (alpha-ketoglutarate) receptor 1 (GPR80)
 Succinate receptor 1 (GPR91)

Subfamily A12
 P2 purinoceptor 
 Purinergic receptor P2Y12
 Purinergic receptor P2Y13 (GPR86) 
 Purinergic receptor P2Y14 (UDP-glucose receptor, KI01) 
 GPR34
 GPR87
 GPR171  (H963)
 Platelet-activating factor receptor (PAFR)

Subfamily A13
 Cannabinoid receptor 
 Cannabinoid receptor 1 (brain) (CB1R)
 Cannabinoid receptor 2 (macrophage) (CB2R)
 Lysophosphatidic acid receptor 
 Lysophosphatidic acid receptor 1
 Lysophosphatidic acid receptor 2
 Lysophosphatidic acid receptor 3
 Sphingosine 1-phosphate receptor 
 Sphingosine 1-phosphate receptor 1
 Sphingosine 1-phosphate receptor 2
 Sphingosine 1-phosphate receptor 3
 Sphingosine 1-phosphate receptor 4
 Sphingosine 1-phosphate receptor 5
 Melanocortin/ACTH receptor 
 Melanocortin 1 receptor (MSHR)
 Melanocortin 3 receptor
 Melanocortin 4 receptor
 Melanocortin 5 receptor
 ACTH receptor, ACTR)
 GPR3
 GPR6
 GPR12  (GPRC)

Subfamily A14
 Eicosanoid receptor 
 Prostaglandin D2 receptor (PD2R)
 Prostaglandin E1 receptor (PE21)
 Prostaglandin E2 receptor (PE22)
 Prostaglandin E3 receptor (PE23)
 Prostaglandin E4 receptor (PE24)
 Prostaglandin F receptor (PF2R)
 Prostaglandin I2 (prostacyclin) receptor (PI2R)
 Thromboxane A2 receptor (TA2R)

Subfamily A15
 Lysophosphatidic acid receptor 
 Lysophosphatidic acid receptor 4
 Lysophosphatidic acid receptor 5
 Lysophosphatidic acid receptor 6 
 P2 purinoceptor 
 Purinergic receptor P2Y10 (P2Y10)
 Protease-activated receptor 
 Coagulation factor II (thrombin) receptor-like 1 (PAR2)
 Coagulation factor II (thrombin) receptor-like 2 (PAR3)
 Coagulation factor II (thrombin) receptor-like 3 (PAR4)
 Epstein-Barr virus induced gene 2 (lymphocyte-specific G protein-coupled receptor)
 Proton-sensing G protein-coupled receptors
 GPR4 
 GPR65 
 GPR68 
 GPR132 (G2A) 
 GPR17 (GPRH)
 GPR18 (GPRI)
 GPR20 (GPRK)
 GPR35
 GPR55
 Coagulation factor II receptor  (THRR)

Subfamily A16
Opsins 
 Rhodopsin (OPSD)
 Opsin 1 (cone pigments), short-wave-sensitive (color blindness, tritan) (OPSB) (blue-sensitive opsin)
 Opsin 1 (cone pigments), medium-wave-sensitive (color blindness, deutan) (OPSG) (green-sensitive opsin)
 Opsin 1 (cone pigments), long-wave-sensitive (color blindness, protan) (OPSR) (red-sensitive opsin)
 Opsin 3, Panopsin
 Opsin 4, Melanopsin
 Opsin 5 (GPR136)
 Retinal G protein coupled receptor
 Retinal pigment epithelium-derived rhodopsin homolog (OPSX) (visual pigment-like receptor opsin)

Subfamily A17
 5-Hydroxytryptamine (5-HT) receptor 
 5-HT2A (5H2A)
 5-HT2B (5H2B)
 5-HT2C (5H2C)
 5-HT6 (5H6) 
 Adrenergic receptor 
 Alpha1A (A1AA)
 Alpha1B (A1AB)
 Alpha1D (A1AD)
 Alpha2A (A2AA)
 Alpha2B (A2AB)
 Alpha2C (A2AC)
 Beta1 (B1AR)
 Beta2 (B2AR)
 Beta3 (B3AR)
 Dopamine receptor 
 D1 (DADR)
 D2 (D2DR)
 D3 (D3DR)
 D4 (D4DR)
 D5 (DBDR)
 Trace amine receptor 
 TAAR1 (TAR1)
 TAAR2 (GPR58)
 TAAR3 (GPR57)
 TAAR5 (PNR)
 TAAR6 (TAR4)
 TAAR8 (GPR102)
 TAAR9 (TAR3)
 Histamine H2 receptor (HH2R)

Subfamily A18
 Histamine H1 receptor (HH1R) 
 Histamine H3 receptor 
 Histamine H4 receptor  
 Adenosine receptor 
 A1 (AA1R)
 A2a (AA2A)
 A2b (AA2B)
 A3 (AA3R)
 Muscarinic acetylcholine receptor 
 M1 (ACM1)
 M2 (ACM2)
 M3 (ACM3)
 M4 (ACM4)
 M5 (ACM5)
 GPR21 (GPRL)
 GPR27
 GPR45 (PSP24)
 GPR52
 GPR61
 GPR62
 GPR63
 GPR78
 GPR84
 GPR85
 GPR88
 GPR101
 GPR161 (RE2)
 GPR173 (SREB3)

Subfamily A19
 5-Hydroxytryptamine (5-HT) receptor 
 5-HT1A (5H1A)
 5-HT1B (5H1B)
 5-HT1D (5H1D)
 5-HT1E (5H1E)
 5-HT1F (5H1F)
 5-HT4 
 5-HT5A (5H5A)
 5-HT7 (5H7)

Unclassified

 Olfactory receptor 
 Nematode chemoreceptor (multiple, including ）
 Taste receptor type 2 
 Vomeronasal receptor type 1 
 VN1R1
 VN1R2
 VN1R3
 VN1R4
 VN1R5

References

External links

 
  This database includes multiple sequence alignments of all GPCR families and sub-families.

G protein-coupled receptors
Protein domains
Protein families